Curved Air – Live was the first official live album by the British progressive rock band Curved Air. It was recorded on the band's reunion tour in December 1974 and released in 1975. Though it failed to enter the charts, it made enough profit to pay off the tax bill which had compelled Curved Air to reunite, allowing Francis Monkman and Florian Pilkington-Miksa to again leave the group.

Background
Sonja Kristina's vocals on the album are atypical of her 1970s performances, both live and in the studio. By her own account, she was in a distraught emotional state following the breakup of her first marriage, and this provoked more wild and raw on-stage singing.

Reception

Allmusic wrote that "Kristina herself is possibly in her best voice ever, while the instrumentation rides roughshod over the... belief that Curved Air were at their best in the studio", offering high praise to nearly all of the individual cuts while criticizing none of them.

Track listing

Personnel
Curved Air
 Sonja Kristina – lead vocals 
 Darryl Way – violin, keyboards, backing vocals 
 Francis Monkman – lead guitar, organ, VCS3 synthesizer 
 Florian Pilkington-Miksa – drums 
 Philip Kohn – bass guitar

Recording details
 Recorded live at Cardiff University and Bristol Polytechnic in December 1974 with the Manor Mobile 
 Re-mixed at Air London Studios 
 Produced by David Hitchcock for BTM Productions 
 Recording Engineer and Re-mix engineer Django Johnny Punter
 Assistant Engineers – Phil Becque, Paul Nunn, Sean Milligan, Andy Morris and Alan Perkins
 Design and Artwork Liz Gilmore 
 Photography Michael Allard for BTM design 
 Special thanks to Ben Mullet and Yamaha for stage equipment

References

External links

Curved Air albums
1975 live albums
Albums produced by Dave Hitchcock